Corinth is a ghost town in Henderson County, Texas, United States.

History
In the 1930s, Corinth had a school, a church, and several homes. By 1990, all that remained of Corinth was its church and some dispersed houses.

References

Geography of Henderson County, Texas
Ghost towns in East Texas